Metarctia debauchei is a moth of the subfamily Arctiinae. It was described by Sergius G. Kiriakoff in 1953. It is found in Burundi.

References

 

Metarctia
Moths described in 1953